Hosagavi is a village in the Mandya district in the southern Indian state of Karnataka. Having Grama Panchayath office which constitutes 5 Villages

References 

Villages in Mandya district